Al Jadid or El Gedid may refer to:
 Al Jadid (magazine), literary magazine on Arabic literature
 Al Jadid, Libya, town in Libya

See also
Jadidah
Al Jadidah
El Jadida